Tibouchina striphnocalyx is a species of flowering plant in the family Melastomataceae, native to north Brazil, Colombia and Venezuela. It was first described in 1828 by Augustin de Candolle as Osbeckia striphnocalyx.

References

striphnocalyx
Flora of Brazil
Flora of Colombia
Flora of Venezuela